Turtle Lake is a lake in Grant County, in the U.S. state of Minnesota.

Turtle Lake was named after the turtles seen there.

See also
List of lakes in Minnesota

References

Lakes of Minnesota
Lakes of Grant County, Minnesota